Olive Garden is an American casual dining restaurant chain specializing in Italian-American cuisine. It is a subsidiary of Darden Restaurants, Inc., which is headquartered in Orange County, Florida. As of 2022, Olive Garden restaurants accounted for $4.5 billion of the $9.63 billion revenue of its parent, Darden.

History 
Olive Garden started as a unit of General Mills. The first Olive Garden was opened on December 13, 1982, in Orlando. By 1989, there were 145 Olive Garden restaurants, making it the fastest-growing units in the General Mills restaurant division. Olive Garden restaurants were uniformly popular, and the chain's per-store sales soon matched former sister company Red Lobster. The company eventually became the largest chain of Italian-themed full-service restaurants in the United States.

General Mills spun off its restaurant holdings as Darden Restaurants (named for Red Lobster founder Bill Darden), a stand-alone company, in 1995. In 2009, Olive Garden was Darden's most inexpensive restaurant chain with an average check per person of $15.00 (USD) versus over $90 at its sibling Capital Grille.

Brad Blum, a former president of Olive Garden, said that sales in existing restaurants sharply decreased, with a 12% decline occurring at one point, even though the company was quickly establishing new restaurants. Sandra Pedicini of the Orlando Sentinel said that "Darden reinvented the Olive Garden in the 1990s, from a floundering chain into an industry star."

As part of a February 2011, Darden analyst conference, the parent group announced it intended to add more than 200 Olive Garden locations in the following few years. The announcement came after a previous announcement that the company would be expanding into potential new international markets for the chain, including the Middle East and Asia, due to the maturity of the North American market. The company also announced it would begin licensing franchising partnerships, a new direction for the chain and its parent which had traditionally relied on expansion via company-owned locations exclusively.

In 2011, Darden announced that it was going to begin co-locating Olive Garden and sibling chain Red Lobster locations. The new restaurants were designed for smaller markets and had separate entrances and dining areas, but unified kitchen and support areas. Menus remained separate, with customers only able to order from the location they are seated in. In 2014, Darden Restaurants announced intentions to sell Red Lobster, to close two Olive Garden and Red Lobster co-locations in Georgia and South Carolina, and to convert the remaining four co-locations into standalone Olive Garden restaurants.

In 2010, Olive Garden generated $3.3 billion in sales. Its closest competitor, Carrabba's Italian Grill, had generated $650.5 million in sales during the same year. By 2012, sales had decreased at Olive Garden. At the final quarter of 2011, sales at established Olive Garden locations had decreased by 2.5%.  The Darden president and chief operating officer, said that Olive Garden at that point was "a beloved, but somewhat expected brand." The company introduced a three-course meal for $12.95 to try to stop the decline.

In 2011, Olive Garden implemented a mandatory tip-out program which allowed them to cut more of their employees' hourly wages to $2.13 per hour. In October 2012, Olive Garden became one of the first national restaurant chains to test converting most of its staff to part-time, aiming to limit the cost of paying for health care benefits for full-time employees.

On July 9, 2014, Olive Garden launched a new logo and restaurant design. This included the addition of online ordering and smaller lunch portions.

Advertising and marketing
Olive Garden's original slogan was "Good Times, Great Salad, Olive Garden". This was used when their main advertising focus was unlimited salad. When unlimited soup and breadsticks were added to the menu, the slogan was changed to "When you're here, you're family". The slogan changed in early 2013 to "We're all family here".

In the fall of 2013, Olive Garden started a promotion for the "Never Ending Pasta Bowl", where customers can eat all the pasta they want starting at $9.99. During the event, the restaurant served over 13 million bowls of pasta. In 2014, the restaurant continued the promotion but added the "Never Ending Pasta Pass", where customers can eat all the pasta they wanted during a seven-week period for $99. This promotion was limited to the first 1000 people to purchase the pass online. The Pasta Pass promotion has been offered every year since.  In 2019, Olive Garden added the "Lifetime Pasta Pass" offered to first fifty diners to sign up for the never ending one.  After granted the first pass selectees were then offered the chance to sign up for the second one.

Locations
As of February 13, 2022, the company operates 900+ restaurants globally.  There are eight locations in Canada, which are Winnipeg, Manitoba (two); Calgary, Alberta; Edmonton, Alberta (two); Saskatoon, Saskatchewan; Regina, Saskatchewan; and Langley, British Columbia near Vancouver. In the 1990s, there had been at various times between 10 and 15 locations in Ontario, but they were all closed in the early 2000s.

Newer restaurants are styled after a farmhouse in the town of Castellina in Chianti, Tuscany, on the grounds of the Rocca delle Macie winery.  The farmhouse is home to the Riserva di Fizzano restaurant adjoining the company's Culinary Institute of Tuscany which was founded in 1999.

In late 2012, two restaurants were opened in Mexico City: Interlomas and Reforma Ave. Currently, there are four restaurants in Mexico City; two in Monterrey, Nuevo León, and one in León, Guanajuato. In May 2018, Olive Garden opened two new restaurants in Gran Plaza, Guadalajara, Mexico and Cancun, Mexico.

In 2013, Olive Garden opened in Kuwait.  It is located in The Avenues. 

In 2014, Olive Garden opened in Lima, Peru under the name Olive Italian Restaurant but with the same menu of the original name restaurants, and it is also located in a main avenue.

In 2014, Olive Garden opened its first restaurant in Brazil, located in terminal 3 of the Guarulhos International Airport in São Paulo.

In 2020, Olive Garden opened its first restaurant in the Philippines at Ayala Malls Manila Bay.

In March 22, 2022, Olive Garden opened its first restaurant in Guayaquil, Ecuador, located in Riocentro Los Ceibos. It was reported that Olive Garden will open more restaurants in Quito and in El Dorado, located in Daule that was planned in 2016. 

In June 21, 2022, Olive Garden opened its first restaurant in Aruba inside the Gloria – Movies, Dining, Entertainment and Play complex.

Menu
Olive Garden serves several types of Italian-American cuisine including pasta dishes, steaks, and salads. The company advertises its breadstick product and centers its lunch menu around it. Additionally, the company advertises that its soups and sauces are made fresh in each location daily instead of importing them from a commissary or outside vendor.

In June 2010, Olive Garden began to import parts of menu formats from its sibling chain, Seasons 52; it began selling smaller dessert portions which it called "dolcini". These new products were modeled after Season 52's "mini-indulgences" product line.

Criticism

H2NO

Tuscan Institute
Despite Olive Garden's advertising that it has a cooking institute in Tuscany, news outlets have reported that, in fact, there is no institute or school. Olive Garden does send a number of managers, trainers, and cooks to Tuscany each year, but they stay in a rented hotel and spend only a few hours at a local restaurant in its off-season.

Activist investor critique

In September 2014, Starboard Value, an activist hedge fund that had acquired a significant portion of Darden's stock and was challenging Darden's management, released a 294-slide presentation assembled by its founder Jeff Smith, that focused on ways the company was wasting money and failing to satisfy customers. Chief among them was the shortcomings of Olive Garden, which earned considerable media attention. Starboard claimed they justified replacing Darden's directors in an upcoming election with a slate sponsored by the hedge fund.

It cited details such as the unlimited breadsticks the chain offered diners, of which too many went to waste since they tended to go stale, Smith claimed, and paying extra for custom-length straws. The chain's menu was too complex, with some of its 96 items making no sense, such as vegetable lasagna topped with chicken ("if you wanted meat on your lasagna, you would order the meat lasagna" the slide read). The chain also had stopped the common practice of adding salt to the water in which it cooked its pasta in order to secure longer warranties on the pots, which had Smith incredulous. "Pasta is Olive Garden's core dish and must be cooked properly." He included photos of poorly executed dishes purchased at Olive Gardens compared with the photos on the chain's website, along with quotes from online reviews posted by disappointed customers.

Darden's management responded with a much shorter presentation two days later. Without going into specifics, it conceded most of Starboard's critique was valid and that the company was already responding to those issues. It defended the unlimited breadsticks policy as "convey[ing] Italian hospitality" and rebutted another claim the hedge fund had made: packaging for take-out food which the hedge fund had claimed was dishwasher-safe and thus needlessly expensive was in fact, merely microwave-safe. Nevertheless, a month later shareholders voted to replace the company's entire board of directors with Starboard's slate, an outcome described as an "epic fail" that happened very rarely.

False claims
In August 2019, Darden responded to false claims that Olive Garden was financing Donald Trump's 2020 presidential campaign, stating: "We don’t know where this information came from, but it is incorrect. Our company does not donate to presidential candidates.” Financial records prove Olive Garden had not contributed to the campaign.

Following the January 6 United States Capitol attack, Anderson Cooper quipped the D.C. rioters would be going to celebrate at Olive Garden when they vacated the Capitol. Darden also replied to rumors that the chain would revoke its lifetime pasta pass to Sean Hannity was a "spoof".

See also
 List of Italian restaurants

References

External links

 Official website

Companies based in Orlando, Florida
Restaurants established in 1982
Darden Restaurants brands
Restaurant chains in the United States
Restaurant chains in Brazil
Restaurant chains in Canada
Italian restaurants
1982 establishments in Florida